78 in the Shade is the fifth and final studio album, and the second during their reunion, by Small Faces. It was released on the Atlantic label in 1978 and re-issued in 2005 on Wounded Bird. The album was created during the brief re-union of the band in the 1970s. The follow up to the reunion album Playmates, 78, like its predecessor, was not successful and the band broke up soon afterwards. Mainstream music in Britain was rapidly changing direction, punk rock having been established around this time.

Guitarist Jimmy McCulloch briefly joined this line-up after leaving Wings. When McCulloch phoned Paul McCartney, who had found him increasingly difficult to work with, to announce he was joining Marriott, McCartney reportedly said "I was a little put out at first, but, well, what can you say to that?" McCulloch's tenure with the band lasted only for a few months in late 1977. 78 in the Shade was his only album with the band.

Reception
78 in the Shade generally gained lukewarm to negative reviews. Allmusic gave the album a review of 2 stars out of five.

The album was reissued as part of “The Complete Atlantic Collection” with the previous album “Playmates” and a single on Wounded Bird in 2021.

Track listing

Personnel 
Small Faces
Steve Marriott – guitar, vocals
Ian McLagan – keyboards, vocals
Rick Wills – bass guitar, vocals
Kenney Jones – drums, vocals

with:

Jimmy McCulloch – guitar (only credited as "Thanks" on LP) McCulloch did play lead guitar on "Thinking About Love" and "You Ain't Seen Nothing Yet"
Vicki Brown, Helen Chappelle, Lavinia Rogers, Madeline Bell, Liza Strike, Sam Brown, Jimmy McCulloch, Stephen Smith, Greg Cobb, Nick Webb - backing vocals

Technical
John Wright - engineer
Larry Franklin - cover illustration
Brian Aris - photography

References

1978 albums
Small Faces albums
Atlantic Records albums